Joaquín Reyes may refer to:

Joaquín Reyes (Spanish actor), Spanish actor
Joaquin Reyes (Filipino actor), Filipino actor
Joaquín Reyes (footballer), Mexican football player
Joaquín Reyes (tennis)